"All You Ever Wanted" is a 2021 song by Rag'n'Bone Man.

All You Ever Wanted may also refer to:

 "All You Ever Wanted", a song by the Black Keys from their 2008 album Attack & Release
 "All You Ever Wanted", the b-side to the UK CD single release of "Strange World" by Ké
 "All You Ever Wanted", a song by the Postmarks from their 2009 album Memoirs at the End of the World 
 "All You Ever Wanted", a song by Llama from their 2001 album Close to the Silence

See also
 All I Ever Wanted (disambiguation)